Gisela von Collande (5 February 1915 – 22 October 1960) was a German film actress.

She was killed in 1960 during a traffic accident. Gisela came from an acting family. She was the sister of the actor and director Volker von Collande. She married the actor Josef Dahmen, with whom she had a daughter Andrea Dahmen. The granddaughter Julia Dahmen also became an actress.

Selected filmography
 Maria the Maid (1936)
 The Traitor (1936)
 The Broken Jug (1937)
 The False Step (1939)
 Target in the Clouds (1939)
 The Bath in the Barn (1943)
 The Sinful Border (1951)
 Roses Bloom on the Moorland (1952)
 Prosecutor Corda (1953)
 Alibi (1955)
 Stopover in Orly (1955)
 Heaven, Love and Twine (1960)
 Sacred Waters (1960)

References

Bibliography

External links

1915 births
1960 deaths
German film actresses
German stage actresses
20th-century German actresses
Actors from Dresden
Road incident deaths in Germany